Mauro Agostini (born 18 October 1989) is an Argentine professional racing cyclist. He rode at the 2015 UCI Track Cycling World Championships. Agostini won the silver medal at the 2015 Pan American Games in the men's team pursuit.

References

External links

1989 births
Living people
Argentine male cyclists
Cyclists at the 2015 Pan American Games
Pan American Games silver medalists for Argentina
Pan American Games medalists in cycling
Medalists at the 2015 Pan American Games